Lekkende is a manor house and estate located 8 km south of Præstø, Vordingborg Municipality, Denmark. The estate was from 1774 to 1993 owned by members of the Raben/Raben-Levetzau family, The main building is from 1838 but was heightened by one storey in 1880.

History

Church and crown land
In the Middle Ages, Lekkende belonged the Bishops of Roskilde. The estate comprised around 240 tenant farms in 1370. During the Reformation, in 1536, Lekkende and all other church land was confiscated by the Crown and alternately placed under the fiefs of Vordingborg and Saltø. Ejler Grubbe, Frederick II's manager on the estate, constructed a number of new buildings in 1585. In 1660, Frederick II granted al of Vordingborg County to his youngest son, Prince George, for life. After his death in 1708. Lekkende reverted to the Crown along with the rest of Vordingborg County. In the 1710s, Lekkende was included in the new Vordingborg Cavalry District.

Raben-Levetzau family
 

In 1774, Vordingborg Cavalry District was divided into 12 estates and sold in public auction. Lekkende was acquired by Frederik Raben. He left the estate to his youngest son, Josias Raben-Levetzau. He constructed a new main building. His widow, Siegfriede von Krogh, ceded the estate to their son Frederik Raben-Levetzau in 1899. He was active in politics and served as Minister of Foreign Affairs in the Cabinet of J.C. Christensen from 1905 to 1908.

In 1931, Frederik Raben-Levetzau ceded Lekkende to his son Johan Otto Raben-Levetzau.

Later history
Lennede was in 2005 acquired by Stig Husted-Andersen via the company Skrumle Landbrug ApS. Husted-Andersen died in 2008. In 2012-13, his three daughters unsuccessfully attempted to sell Lekkende for DKK 1900 million. One of the daughters, Dichte Husted-Andersen, has lived in the main building.

Architecture
The main building from 1838 consisted of two single-story wings which met in three-story "tower" overlooking the garden. The two low wings were heightened to two stories in 1880. The building is yellow with white cornices. The tower is topped by a domed roof surrounded by four pinnacles.

List of owners
 ( -1536) Roskilde bispestol 
 (1536-1670) Kronen 
 (1670-1708) Prins Jørgen 
 (1708-1774) Kronen 
 (1774-1820) Frederik Raben 
 (1820-1889) Josias Raben-Levetzau 
 (1889-1899) Siegfriede von Krogh gift Raben-Levetzau 
 (1899-1931) Frederik Raben-Levetzau
 (1931-1992) Johan Otto Valdemar Raben-Levetzau
 (1889-1933) Frederik Ivan Josias Raben-Levetzau
 (1993-2005) Andreas Hastrup
 (2005-2008) Stig Husted-Andersen
 (2008- ) Estate of Stig Husted-Andersen

References 

Manor houses in Vordingborg Municipality
Houses completed in 1838
Buildings and structures associated with the Raben family
Prince George of Denmark